Turkish nationalism is a political ideology that promotes and glorifies the Turkish people, as either national or ethnic definition. The term "ultranationalism" is often used to describe Turkish nationalism.

History

After the fall of the Ottoman Empire, Mustafa Kemal Atatürk came to power. He introduced a language reform with the aim to "cleanse" the Turkish language of foreign (mostly Arabic and Persian) influence. He also promoted the Turkish History Thesis in Turkish political and educational circles from 1930s. Turkish researchers at the time like Hüseyin Cahit Yalçın and Rıfat Osman Bey also came up with the idea that Early Sumerians were proto-Turks. 

The early Turkish nationalists were typically secular and often influenced by Ziya Gökalp (1876–1924). Gökalp aimed for the Turkification of Islam; that the Quran should be translated from Arabic into Turkish, and that the adhan should be shouted in Turkish instead of Arabic from the Minarets. During the early years of the republic, religious traditions were not important and Turkish nationalists were much more open to the westernization of the Turkish society.

Variants

Ideologies associated with Turkish nationalism include Pan-Turkism or Turanism (a form of ethnic or racial essentialism or national mysticism), Turkish-Islamic synthesis (which combines Turkish nationalism with Islamic identity), Anatolianism (which considers the Turkish nation as a separate entity which developed after the Seljuk conquest of Anatolia in the 11th century), and secular, civic nationalist Kemalism (which defines the "Turks" as the national identity of the people of Turkey).

Kemalism

Implemented by Atatürk, the founding ideology of the Republic of Turkey features nationalism as one of its six principles.

The Kemalist revolution aimed to create a nation state from the remnants of the multi-religious and multi-ethnic Ottoman Empire. Kemalist nationalism originates from the social contract theories, especially from the civic nationalist principles advocated by Jean-Jacques Rousseau and his Social Contract. The Kemalist perception of social contract was effected by the dissolution of the Ottoman Empire which was perceived as a product of failure of the Ottoman "Millet" system and the ineffective Ottomanism policy. Kemalist nationalism, after experiencing the Ottoman Empire's breakdown, defined the social contract as its "highest ideal".

In the 1930s Kemalism became an all-encompassing state ideology based on Atatürk's sayings and writings. The Kemalist definition of nationality was integrated to Article 66 of the Constitution of the Republic of Turkey. Legally, every citizen is defined as a Turk, regardless of ethnicity or religion. Turkish nationality law states that he or she can be deprived of his/her nationality only through an act of treason.

Kemalist nationalism believes in the principle that the Turkish state is an indivisible whole comprising its territory and people, which is defined as the "unity of the state".

Pan-Turkism

"Turanist" nationalism began with the Turanian Society founded in 1839, followed in 1908 with the Turkish Society, which later became the Turkish Hearths and eventually expanded to include ideologies such as Pan-Turanism and Pan-Turkism.

Pan-Turkism, as he stated in his book Principles of Turkism, was also a part of Ziya Gökalp's nationalist view which he called "Turkism", as an ideal of the unity of Turkic peoples.

The Young Turk Revolution which overthrew Sultan Abdul Hamid II, brought Turkish nationalists to power in the Ottoman Empire, eventually leading to the Three Pashas' control of the late Ottoman government.

Anatolianism
Anatolianism takes as its starting point that the main source of Turkish culture should be Anatolia (Anadolu), and the main base of this thought is that the Turkish people had built a new civilization in Anatolia after 1071 when they won at the Battle of Manzikert.

In the early Republican era, some intellectuals like Hilmi Ziya Ülken, Mehmet Râif Ogan and Nurettin Topçu proposed that the origins of the Turkish nationalism should be sought in Anatolia, not in "Turan".

Hilmi Ziya Ülken, one of the founders of Anatolianism, was opposed to Neo-Ottomanism and Pan-Islamism, as well as to Turanism. In 1919, Ülken wrote a book titled Anadolunun Bugünki Vazifeleri (Present Duties of Anatolia), but it was not published. Ülken and friends published the periodical Anadolu. They worked to form an alternative philosophy to Ottomanism, Islamism and Turanism.

Turkish-Islamic nationalism 

Turkish-Islamic nationalism, also known as the Turkish-Islamic synthesis is a far-right Islamic-conservative ideology that combines Turkish nationalism and Islam.

The term was coined in 1972 by the conservative historian İbrahim Kafesoğlu, who traced the Turkish-Islamic synthesis back to the first Muslim Turkic dynasty, the Karakhanids, in the 11th century. Kafesoğlu viewed the contact between the ancient steppe culture of the Turks and Islam as a process of refinement. The "synthesis" was represented in the 1970s in the intellectual club Aydınlar Ocağı (literally "The Hearth of Intellectuals") whose founder was Kafesoğlu. Representatives of the intellectual club explicitly formulated their thoughts and in particular their understanding of history in 1973 in the text Aydınlar Ocağı'nın Görüşü (literally "The View of the Hearth of Intellectuals"). The starting point was anti-communism and an endeavor to counter the Marxist ideology, which was perceived as a threat to Turkish values.

After the turmoil of the 1970s with bloody clashes between political camps and the 1980 Turkish coup d'état, the junta tried, despite reservations about religious fundamentalism, to use Islamic-conservative ideas and values to restore order and unity. Following the 1980 coup d'état, the military dictatorship made a combination of Pan-Turkism, Turkish-Islamic synthesis, and Kemalism as the official state ideology. Thought leaders of the Turkish-Islamic synthesis assumed that the Turks played a prominent role in the spread of Islam and thereby developed their national identity as part of the Islamic ummah. According to this conception, being Turkish is only possible in connection with Islam. The idea of a Turkish-Islamic synthesis is still very popular in circles of the Ülkücü movement.

Turkish Cypriot nationalism

Turkish Cypriot nationalism emphasizes the support for the independence of the Turkish Republic of Northern Cyprus (TRNC) and desires that the TRNC stay independent from Turkey while opposing the idea of a united Cyprus with the Greek-dominated Republic of Cyprus.

Neo-Nazism and neo-fascism
A neo-Nazi group existed in 1969 in İzmir, when a group of former Republican Villagers Nation Party members (precursor party of the Nationalist Movement Party) founded the association "Nasyonal Aktivitede Zinde İnkişaf" (Vigorous Development in National Activity). The club maintained two combat units. The members wore SA uniforms and used the Hitler salute. One of the leaders (Gündüz Kapancıoğlu) was re-admitted to the Nationalist Movement Party in 1975.

Today, apart from neo-fascist Grey Wolves and the Turkish ultranationalist MHP, there are some neo-Nazi organizations in Turkey such as the Ataman Brotherhood, or the Turkish Nazi Party and the National Socialist Party of Turkey which are mainly based on the Internet.

The "Insulting Turkishness" laws
Article 301 of the Turkish Penal Code, which is perceived as being contrary to the notion of freedom of speech, states: The person who publicly denigrates the Turkish Nation, the Republic of Turkey, the Grand National Assembly of Turkey, the Government of the Republic of Turkey and the judicial organs of the State, shall be punished with imprisonment of six months to two years. But also it can be only with permission of the Minister of Justice. However, it also states that Expressions of thought intended to criticize shall not constitute a crime.

There have been recent indications that Turkey may repeal or modify Article 301, after the embarrassment suffered by some high-profile cases. Nationalists within the judicial system, intent on derailing Turkey's full admission into the European Union, have used Article 301 to initiate trials against people like Nobel Prize–winning Turkish novelist Orhan Pamuk, the Turkish novelist Elif Shafak, and the late Hrant Dink for acknowledging the existence of the Armenian genocide.

In May 2007, a law was put into effect allowing Turkey to block websites that are deemed insulting to Atatürk.

References

Sources 
Arman, Murat Necip.  "The Sources Of Banality In Transforming Turkish Nationalism". CEU Political Science Journal, issue: 02 / 2007, pp. 133–151.
Eissenstat, Howard. "Anatolianism: The History of a Failed Metaphor of Turkish Nationalism". Paper presented at Middle East Studies Association Conference, Washington, D.C., November 2002.
Tachau, Frank.  "The Search for National Identity among the Turks". Die Welt des Islams, New Series, Vol. 8, Issue 3 (1963), pp. 165–176.]

Further reading

External links

Political movements in Turkey